Flustrina is a suborder under the order Cheilostomatida of gymnolaematan Bryozoa (sea mats). 

The structure of the individual zooids is generally simple, a box-like chamber of calcium carbonate, the polypides reaching out through an uncalcified flexible frontal wall, often surrounded by numerous spines. Like in other gymnolaematans, their lophophore is protruded by muscles that pull on the frontal wall of the zooid.

In some treatments, the Flustrina are restricted to the superfamilies Calloporoidea and Flustroidea and ranked as infraorder alongside the Cellulariomorpha which contain the other three superfamilies. What here is considered the Fulstrina is then called the infraorder Neocheilostomina, and in a more radical variant also includes the Ascophora as another infraorder.

The obsolete sub-order Anasca previously included the members of this sub-order before being deprecated.

The families Fusicellariidae, Skyloniidae, Bicorniferidae, as well as the genera Hoeverella and Taeniocellaria are currently incertae sedis within the Flustrina.

Systematics
The superfamilies and families (and notable genera) are listed in the presumed phylogenetic sequence:
 Basal or incertae sedis
 Genus Hoeverella
 Genus Taeniocellaria
 Family Calescharidae (Microporoidea?)
 Family Coscinopleuridae (Calloporoidea or Microporoidea)
 Family Fusicellariidae
 Family Skyloniidae
 Family Bicorniferidae
 Superfamily Calloporoidea Norman, 1903
 Family Calloporidae
 Family Antroporidae
 Family Doryporellidae
 Family Chaperiidae
 Family Hiantoporidae
 Family Foveolariidae
 Family Quadricellariidae
 Family Bryopastoridae
 Family Vinculariidae
 Family Farciminariidae
 Family Tendridae
 Family Heliodomidae
 Family Cupuladriidae
 Superfamily Flustroidea Fleming, 1828
 Family Flustridae
 Superfamily Buguloidea Gray, 1848
 Family Bugulidae
 Family Rhabdozoidae
 Family Beaniidae
 Family Epistomiidae
 Family Euoplozoidae
 Family Candidae (= Cabereidae, Scrupocellariidae)
 Family Jubellidae (disputed)

 Superfamily Microporoidea Gray, 1848
 Family Microporidae
 Family Poricellariidae
 Family Setosellidae
 Family Selenariidae
 Family Otionellidae
 Family Lunulitidae
 Family Lunulariidae
 Family Onychocellidae
 Family Aspidostomatidae
 Family Steginoporellidae
 Family Thalamoporellidae
 Family Alysidiidae
 Family Chlidoniidae
 Family Monoporellidae
 Family Macroporidae
 Superfamily Cellarioidea Lamouroux, 1821
 Family Cellariidae
 Family Membranicellariidae

See also
Cauloramphus disjunctus
Flustra foliacea

References

Protostome suborders
Cheilostomatida